The 1910 Columbus Panhandles season was their fifth season in existence. The team played in the Ohio League posted a 3–2–2 record.

Schedule

References

Columbus Panhandles seasons
Columbus Pan
Columbus Pan